Petrowki (also Romanized as Petrowkī) is a village in Piveshk Rural District, Lirdaf District, Jask County, Hormozgan Province, Iran. At the 2006 census, its population was 198, in 43 families.

References 

Populated places in Jask County